The Ford Ministry is the Cabinet, chaired by Premier Doug Ford, that began governing Ontario shortly before the opening of the 42nd Parliament. The original members were sworn in during a ceremony held at Queen's Park on June 29, 2018.

Ford has carried out two major Cabinet reshuffles: once in 2019, 2021, and 2022.

History

2018 
The cabinet was sworn in by Lieutenant Governor Elizabeth Dowdeswell on June 29. The cabinet featured Ford as Premier and Minister of Intergovernmental Affairs with former Progressive Conservative leadership candidates Christine Elliott as Deputy Premier and Minister of Health, and Caroline Mulroney as Attorney General. Former interim leaders of the Progressive Conservatives Vic Fedeli and Jim Wilson were assigned to be Minister of Finance and Minister of Economic Development, respectively. This initial cabinet also featured Lisa MacLeod as both Minister of Community and Social Services and Minister of Children and Youth Services, Lisa Thompson as Minister of Education, Rod Phillips as Minister of the Environment, and John Yakabuski as Minister of Transportation.

The first change to the cabinet came on November 2, 2018, when Jim Wilson resigned to sit as an independent and Todd Smith assumed his role as Minister of Economic Development.

2019 - 2020 
The first major cabinet shuffle came on June 20, 2019, as the premier expanded the cabinet to 28 members Doug Downey, Paul Calandra, Stephen Lecce and Ross Romano were promoted to cabinet to be Attorney General, Government House Leader, Minister of Education, and Ministry of Training, Colleges and Universities, respectively. Jill Dunlop, Kinga Surma, and Prabmeet Sarkaria were promoted to be Associate Ministers. Rod Phillips became Minister of Finance, Jeff Yurek the Minister of the Environment, Todd Smith the Minister of Children and Youth Services, Caroline Mulroney the Minister of Transportation, Vic Fedeli the Minister of Economic Development, Lisa Thompson the Minister of Government and Consumer Services, Lisa MacLeod the Minister of Tourism, Culture and Sport, Laurie Scott the Minister of Infrastructure, and Monte McNaughton the Minister of Labour. Bill Walker and Michael Tibollo were demoted from ministerial positions to be Associate Ministers, and Christine Elliott's portfolio split with Merrilee Fullerton taking over the newly created Ministry of Long-Term Care.

2021 
In February 2021, Peter Bethlenfalvy replaced Rod Phillips as Minister of Finance following criticism of his international vacations during the COVID-19 pandemic, though he returned to cabinet in June as the Minister of Long-Term Care. That June shuffle removed 5 members (Jeff Yurek, John Yakabuski, Laurie Scott, Bill Walker, and Ernie Hardeman) and introduced 6 new members to cabinet, including David Piccini as Minister of the Environment, Parm Gill as Minister of Citizenship and Multiculturalism, Khaleed Rasheed as Associate Minister of Digital Government, Stan Cho as Associate Minister of Transportation, Nina Tangri as Associate Minister for Small Business and Red Tape Reduction, and Jane McKenna as the Associate Minister of Children and Women's Issues. Kinga Surma and Jill Dunlop were promoted from their associate minister roles to be Minister of Infrastructure and Minister of Colleges and Universities, respectively, with Prabmeet Sakaria being promoted from associate minister to President of the Treasury Board.

List of Ministers

See also
List of premiers of Ontario

Notes

References

Succession 

Politics of Ontario
Executive Council of Ontario
2018 establishments in Ontario
Ministries of Elizabeth II
Ministries of Charles III
Cabinets established in 2018